Christopher O'Brien (born 16 November 1950) is a Welsh former rugby union and professional rugby league footballer who played in the 1970s and 1980s.

Background
O'Brien was born in Newtown, Cardiff, Wales.

International honours
Chris O'Brien won a cap for Wales (RL) while at Cardiff City (Bridgend) Blue Dragons in the 9–28 defeat by England on Sunday 14 October 1984 at Eugene Cross Park, Ebbw Vale.

References

External links
Statistics at orl-heritagetrust.org.uk

1950 births
Living people
Cardiff City Blue Dragons players
Oldham R.L.F.C. players
Rugby league fullbacks
Rugby league second-rows
Rugby league wingers
Rugby league players from Cardiff
Rugby union players from Cardiff
Wales national rugby league team players
Welsh rugby league players
Welsh rugby union players